Sheikh Zayed bin Khalifa Al Nahyan (1835 – 18 May 1909), also known as Zayed the Great or Zayed the First was the Sheikh of Abu Dhabi from 1855 to his death in 1909. He was the grandfather and namesake of Sheikh Zayed bin Sultan, founder of the United Arab Emirates.

Biography

He was born in the emirate of Abu Dhabi, in what was then called Trucial Oman, sometime around 1840.  He lived much of his early life with the Bedouin of Abu Dhabi. He was made Ruler of Abu Dhabi after the deposition of his cousin, Sheikh Saeed bin Tahnun, in 1855. He ruled for 54 years, until his death in 1909. He had a wife called Maitha Almansoori.

Early in his rule, Zayed guided Abu Dhabi through a series of conflicts with the Emirate of Sharjah. In 1868, during an armed clash with Sharjah's forces, he advanced ahead of his troops and challenged the Ruler of Sharjah, Sheikh Khalid bin Sultan Al Qasimi, to single combat. Zayed wounded Khalid mortally and the death of Khalid brought an end to the conflict - although outbreaks of internecine conflict continued to be the norm among the coastal communities.

Zayed also led Abu Dhabi in an extended war with Qatar in the 1880s that secured the western border of Abu Dhabi. He united with Omani forces to drive the Saudi troops from the Buraimi area in 1870. This left the forts defending the Buraimi Oasis in permanent control of Abu Dhabi and forced the Saudis to abandon their designs on Oman. Abu Dhabi's influence and control over this area steadily grew afterwards. Zayed supported the Omani Imam Azzan bin Qais against the Sultan of Muscat, Turki bin Said, at the Battle of Dhank.

In 1895, Zayed  saw in Al Zorah (today part of Ajman) an ideal base for supplying Bani Qitab forces loyal to him in conflicts with the Northern Sheikhs and applied to the British Resident for permission to move supplies there by sea. Unaware of the true reasons for the movement, the Resident gave permission but Zayed faced opposition in his scheme from other Sheikhs and was unable to complete the movement. In 1897, a section of the Sudan (singular Al Suwaidi) tribe under Sultan bin Nasser Al Suwaidi requested permission to settle Al Zorah with the support of Zayed (himself a Suwaidi on his mother's side and married to one of Sultan's daughters) and this was granted by the Resident.

Alarmed by the scheme, the Ruler of Ajman built a fort at one of the waterways connecting Al Zorah with the mainland (it was at the time an island) and the Ruler of Sharjah, in 1890, appealed to the Resident to prevent this establishment of a non-Al Qasimi stronghold in the midst of his territory. This being upheld, to the annoyance of Zayed who had seen Al Zorah as an extension of his claim to the Northern coast, the scheme was abandoned and the decision to block it was subsequently upheld after a visit to Al Zorah by Major Cox, the British Political Resident.

Zayed was also noted by Percy Cox to be "troublesome" and guided the rest of the Sheikhs of Dubai and Umm Al Quwain to not adopt the White Pierced Red flag, the intended flag of the Trucial States, referencing that the flag represents the Al Qawasim tribal federation.

In 1892, Zayed signed a treaty with the United Kingdom which effectively ceded control of Abu Dhabi's international commercial relations to the British.

By 1894, Zayed was considered the most powerful of the Trucial Sheikhs, replacing the hegemony of Sharjah.

Through strategic marriages he had many sons. The eldest of whom was named Khalifa, and had maternal heritage from the Manasir people.

He had a brother called Dhiyab who had three sons, Sultan, Mohammed, and Ahmed.

See also 
 Al Jahili Fort

Sources

References 
 Al-Hajji, Jayanti Maitra Afra (2001). Qasr Al Hosn: The History of the Rulers of Abu Dhabi: 1793–1966,  Abu Dhabi: Centre for Documentation and Research.
 Discovery! The Story Of Aramco Then.

1835 births
1909 deaths
House of Al Nahyan
Sheikhs of Abu Dhabi
19th-century Arabs